Henry Charles Stackpole III (May 7, 1935 – May 29, 2020) was a lieutenant general in the United States Marine Corps. He was an alumnus of Princeton University. 

Stackpole was a graduate of Notre Dame High School in West Haven, Connecticut. He entered the Marine Corps in 1957. 

In 1966 Stackpole was serving as company commander, Company I, 3rd Battalion, 5th Marines, 1st Marine Division in South Vietnam when he was hit in the leg by a .50 caliber bullet. 

From August 1970 through June 1973, Stackpole was assigned as commanding officer, executive officer and Marine officer instructor, Naval Reserve Officers Training Corps (NROTC) Unit, Stanford University. As a colonel, Stackpole served as commanding officer of 7th Marine Regiment from 7 August 1981 to 16 February 1983. Other Commands he held included Joint Task Force Sea Angel (in Bangladesh), director, Plans and Policy Directorate, USCINCLANT, Norfolk, Virginia and commanding officer of the 17th Marine Amphibious Unit.. Stackpole was promoted to the rank of lieutenant general on 23 July 1991 and served as deputy chief of staff for plans, policies and operations, Headquarters Marine Corps, Washington, D.C., in 1991, followed by assignment as commander of Marine Forces Pacific and Fleet Marine Force, Pacific from July 1992 to 1994. He retired from the Marine Corps on 1 September 1994. 

His military decorations included the Defense Superior Service Medal, Silver Star, Legion of Merit, and Purple Heart.

General Stackpole died on May 29, 2020, in Hawaii.

References

United States Marine Corps generals
1935 births
2020 deaths
Military personnel from New Haven, Connecticut
Princeton University alumni
Recipients of the Silver Star
Recipients of the Legion of Merit
Recipients of the Defense Superior Service Medal